Corana is a comune (municipality) in the Province of Pavia in the Italian region Lombardy, located about  southwest of Milan and about  southwest of Pavia.

Corana borders the following municipalities: Bastida de' Dossi, Cervesina, Pieve Albignola, Sannazzaro de' Burgondi, Silvano Pietra, Voghera, Zinasco.

Corana was the site of a royal estate in the 12th century, according to the Indiculus curiarum.

References

Cities and towns in Lombardy